Chicago is considered the most gang-occupied city in the United States, with a population ranging from 1
active members from over 70 gangs with more than 150,000 members. Gang warfare and retaliation is common in Chicago. Gangs were responsible for 61% of the homicides in Chicago in 2011.

History

Hispanic-on-Hispanic homicides   increased in the summer of 1971 due to the Latin Kings gang election meetings.
In July 2021, federal agents participating in Operation Legend arrested 27 Black Disciples gang members associated with drugs and gun  violations in  the Englewood neighborhood on the South Side of Chicago.

Purported causes
Former Chicago Police Superintendent, Garry McCarthy, blames Chicago's gang culture for its high rates of homicide and other violent crime, stating "It's very frustrating to know that it's like 7% of the population causes 80% of the violent crime... The gangs here are traditional gangs that are generational, if you will. The grandfather was a gang member, the father's a gang member, and the kid right now is going to be a gang member".

Policing strategy
Former Mayor Rahm Emanuel disbanded the Chicago Police Department's anti-gang unit in 2012 in order to focus on beat patrols, which he said would have a more long-term solution to violence than anti-gang units.

Composition
Most traditional Chicago street gangs, known as nations, fall under two main factions called the People Nation and the Folks Nation, with the former having most, if not all gangs under the "Almighty" moniker while the latter having most gangs divided into various sub-factions, the majority of which are a part of an alliance called Latin Folks which are further divided into groups called familias. There are also nations that are independent of both the Folks and People Nations, such as the Black Soul Nation. Street gangs that are independent of Folks and People but retain similar identifiers and symbolism as well as maintain a hierarchical structure in membership are known as war crews and do not identify as nations though they will engage in traditional gang activity and may conflict with nations as well as other crews. Street gangs that do not retain any semblance of traditional nations or war crews are known simply as cliques. Each individual gang is divided into sets which are territories spanning blocks or neighborhoods that may be divided further into subsets. There are currently at least 70 active Chicago street gangs with 747 factions that have been identified. Currently active street gangs in Chicago are:

Folks Nation

Latin Folks Familias: 

Almighty Familia: 

 Almighty Ambrose Nation
 Almighty Brazer Nation
 Almighty Harrison Gent Nation
 Almighty Imperial Gangster Nation
 Almighty Insane Pope Nation (Folks Nation)
 Almighty Krazy Getdown Boy Nation
 Almighty Latin Eagle Nation
 Almighty Simon City Royal Nation

Gangster Familia:

 Gangster Disciple Nation
 Gangster Two-Six Nation
 Gangster Party People Nation

Insane Familia:

 Insane Ashland Viking Nation
 Insane Campbell Boy Nation (defunct)
 Insane C-Note Nation
 Insane Deuce Nation
 Insane Dragon Nation
 Insane King Cobra Nation

 Insane Orquesta Albany Nation
 Insane Outlaw Gangster Nation

 Insane Spanish Cobra Nation

 Insane Young Latino Organization Cobra Nation

Maniac Familia:

 Maniac Latin Disciple Nation

 Maniac Campbell Boy Nation

 Maniac Young Latino Organization Disciple Nation

No Family:

 Allport Lover Nation (likely defunct)

 Aztec Soul Nation

 Black Disciple Nation

 Black King Cobra Nation (No relation to Black Cobra Souls, Mickey Cobras, Insane King Cobras or Insane Spanish Cobras)

 Boss Pimp Nation

 Hoodlum Nation

 Insane Gangster Satan Disciple Nation (formerly Insane Familia and Gangster Familia)
 Insane Gangster Sin City Boy Nation

 Insane Gangster City Knight Nation (given prefix by Insane Gangster Satan Disciple Nation)

 Insane Two-Two Boy Nation (formerly Insane Familia)

 Insane Majestic Nation

 La Raza Nation

 Latin Dragon Nation

 Latin Jiver Nation

 Universal Latin Lover Nation

 Latin Soul Nation

 Latin Styler Nation

 Milwaukee King Nation

 Spanish Gangster Disciple Nation

 Wolcott Boy Nation

People Nation
Almighty Bishop Nation
Almighty Black P. Stone Nation
Almighty Familia Stone Nation
Almighty Four Corner Hustler Nation
Almighty Gaylord Nation
Almighty Insane Latin Brother Nation
Almighty Insane Latin Count Nation
Almighty Insane Pope Nation (Southside, People Nation)
Almighty Insane Unknown Nation
Almighty Laflin Lover Nation (likely defunct)
Almighty Latin Angel Nation
Almighty Latin King and Queen Nation
Almighty Latin Pachuco Nation
Almighty Latin Stone Nation
Almighty Noble Knight Nation
Almighty Party Player Nation
Almighty Puerto Rican Stone Nation (likely defunct)
Almighty Saints Nation
Almighty Spanish Four Corner Hustler Nation
Almighty Spanish Lord Nation
Almighty Spanish Vice Lord Nation
Almighty Stoned Freak Nation
Almighty Twelfth Player Nation
Almighty True Warlord Nation
Almighty Vice Lord Nation
Almighty Villa Lobo Nation
Chi-West Nation
Fourth Generation Messiah Nation
Mickey Cobra Nation
Taylor Jouster Nation (defunct)

Independent gangs

 Black Gangster Nation

 Black Souls Nation
 Mara Salvatrucha (defunct)
 Bloods (defunct)
 Sureños (defunct)

Crews

 103rd Street Crew
 35th Street Crew
 61st Boys
 Adidas Boys
 Akrhos
 Bad Boys
 Born Legends
 Crazy Latino Boys
 Goonie Boys (likely defunct)
 Homicide Boys
 Krazy Ass Latinos
 Lynch Mob
 Mafia Family (likely defunct)
 Maniac Players
 One of the Boys
 Outlaws
 Nike Boys
 Polish Mafia
 Slag Valley Boys
 South Deering Boys
 Southwest Boys (formerly a Gangster Two-Six future crew)
 West Lawns (defunct)
 Winchester Boys
 Vietnamese Clan

See also
Crime in Chicago
Gangs in the United States

References